PSLV-C6 was the sixth operational launch and overall ninth mission of the PSLV program. This launch was also the fifty-fourth launch by Indian Space Research Organisation since its first mission on 1 January 1962. The vehicle carried and injected India's two satellites; Cartosat-1 (a.k.a. IRS-P5) and HAMSAT into the Sun-synchronous orbit. PSLV-C6 was launched at 04:44 hours Coordinated Universal Time (10:14 hours Indian Standard Time) on 5 May 2005 from the second launch pad of the Satish Dhawan Space Centre.

Mission highlights
Sixth operational launch of the PSLV program.
Overall ninth mission of the PSLV program.
Overall fifty-fourth launch by Indian Space Research Organisation.
First flight to be launched from the second launch pad of Satish Dhawan Space Centre.
Carried and injected two satellites built by ISRO.

Mission parameters
 Mass:
 Total liftoff weight: 
 Payload weight: 
 Overall height: 
 Propellant:
 First stage: Solid HTPB based (138.0 + 6 x 9 tonnes)
 Second stage: Liquid UH 25 +  (41.5 tonnes)
 Third stage: Solid HTPB based (7.6 tonnes)
 Fourth stage: Liquid MMH + MON (2.5 tonnes)
 Engine:
 First stage: Core (PS 1) + 6 strap-on PSOM
 Second stage: Vikas
 Third stage: PS 3
 Fourth stage: PS 4
 Thrust:
 First stage: 4,762 + 645 x 6 kN
 Second stage: 800 kN
 Third stage: 246 kN
 Fourth stage: 7.3 x 2 kN
 Altitude: 
 Maximum velocity: (recorded at time of payload separation)
 Duration: 1,120 seconds

Payload
PSLV-C6 carried and deployed two Indian satellites, Cartosat-1 (a.k.a. IRS-P5) and HAMSAT into the Sun-synchronous orbit. Built by ISRO, Cartosat-1 was a stereoscopic remote sensing satellite and first of the Cartosat series of satellites. HAMSAT was a microsatellite, built for providing satellite based amateur radio satellite to the national as well as the international community of amateur radio operators (HAM).

Launch & planned flight profile

PSLV-C6 was launched at 04:44 hours Coordinated Universal Time (10:14 hours Indian Standard Time) on 5 May 2005 from the second launch pad of the Satish Dhawan Space Centre. Following was the flight profile.

See also
 Indian Space Research Organisation
 Polar Satellite Launch Vehicle

References

External links 

Spacecraft launched in 2005
Polar Satellite Launch Vehicle